The 2001–02 season was Kilmarnock's fourth consecutive season in the Scottish Premier League. Kilmarnock also competed in the Scottish Cup, Scottish League Cup and the UEFA Cup.

Summary

Season
Kilmarnock finished seventh in the Scottish Premier League with 49 points. They reached the fourth round of the Scottish Cup, losing to Celtic. They also reached the third round of the League Cup, losing to rivals Ayr United on penalties, and lost in the first round of the UEFA Cup to Viking FK. Manager Bobby Williamson departed for Hibernian in February 2002 and was replaced by former Heart of Midlothian manager Jim Jefferies.

Results and fixtures

Kilmarnock's score comes first

Scottish Premier League

UEFA Cup

Scottish League Cup

Scottish Cup

Player statistics

|}

Final league table

Division summary

Transfers

Players in

Players out

References

External links
 Kilmarnock 2001–02 at Soccerbase.com (select relevant season from dropdown list)

Kilmarnock F.C. seasons
Kilmarnock